Eileen Hickey (July 7, 1945 – March 5, 1999) was an American politician from New York.

Life
She was born Eileen McKenna on July 7, 1945, in Poughkeepsie, Dutchess County, New York, the daughter of Peter McKenna and Ruth (Mollica) McKenna. She attended Our Lady of Lourdes High School. She graduated from the White Plains Hospital School of Nursing in 1964, and became a registered nurse. On October 29, 1966, she married Daniel G. Hickey, and they had one son.

She entered politics as a Democrat, and was a member of the Dutchess County Legislature. In November 1990, she unseated the Republican Assemblyman Donald H. McMillen, and was a member of the New York State Assembly (97th D.) in 1993 and 1994. In 1994, she graduated B.A. from Marist College. In November 1994, she ran for re-election, but was defeated by Republican Joel M. Miller. Afterwards she became an aide to State Senate Minority Leader Martin Connor.

She died on March 5, 1999; and was buried at the Saint Peter Cemetery in Poughkeepsie.

References

External links

1945 births
1999 deaths
Politicians from Poughkeepsie, New York
Democratic Party members of the New York State Assembly
Women state legislators in New York (state)
Marist College alumni
20th-century American politicians
20th-century American women politicians